The Buddhist and Pali University of Sri Lanka is a Buddhist university in Homagama, Sri Lanka. It was founded in 1981 and is organized in two faculties.

Objectives

The objectives that were fundamental to the establishment of the university in the Buddhist and Pali University of Sri Lanka Act No. 74 of 1981 as amended by the Buddhist and Pali University of Sri Lanka Act No. 37 of 1995:

The training of savants in the Buddhist Doctrine and Discipline for the purpose of the dissemination of Buddhism and nurturing of Buddhist missionary activities in Sri Lanka and abroad.
    The promotion of the study of the Pali Language, Buddhist Culture and Buddhist Philosophy in Sri Lanka and abroad, and the enhancement of those studies as befitting the modern world trends.
    (a) The training of the student monks and the lay male students to teach Buddhism and Pali Language in the Pirivenas, Schools and in similar institutions.
    (b) The provision of facilities to maintain and promote courtesy and civility and mental discipline among the student monks and the lay male students.
    (c) Any other matter connected with or ancillary to the above objectives.

The objective of establishing this university is not merely offering degree programmes as it is done in any other national university. This is an institution that has been established, to achieve the aims of disseminating Dhamma in Sri Lanka and throughout the world, to promote the study of Dhamma and Discipline (Vinaya), to provide facilities for monk students and lay students in pirivenas, schools and other such institutions, teaching pali language and it is also expected to assist the monk students.

The subject stream of this university is confined to Buddhist Philosophy, Buddhist Culture, Archaeology, Religious Studies and Comparative Philosophy, Pali, Sanskrit, English and Sinhala. Pali and Buddhist Philosophy or Buddhist Culture is compulsory.

The priority is given to Buddhist monks when selecting students as this is an institution established to uplift, especially, Pali Language studies and Buddhist Studies.

History

The Buddhist and Pali University of Sri Lanka was established by the Act of Parliament No. 74 of 1981 of the Democratic Socialist Republic of Sri Lanka and was inaugurated in 1982. The objectives of this university were the propagation of Buddhism, the development of Pali and Buddhist Studies in Sri Lanka and foreign countries and the provision of facilities for research in the relevant fields. The above-mentioned Act has been revised by the Buddhist and Pali University of Sri Lanka (Amendment) Act No. 37 of 1995. With the activation of the amendments, the affiliated institutions became defunct. The Buddhist and Pali University was restructured in accordance with the structure of the other universities of Sri Lanka.

It is a member of the Association of Commonwealth Universities, International Association of Theravada Buddhist universities

Faculties

Faculty of Buddhist Studies
Dean, Faculty of Buddhist Studies, Prof. Samantha Illangakoon

Departments:
 Department of Buddhist Philosophy
 Department of Religious studies and Comparative Philosophy
 Department of Buddhist Culture
 Department of Archaeology

Units:
 Computer Teaching Unit (CTU)

Faculty of Language Studies
Dean, Faculty of Language Studies, Associate Prof. Ven. Lenagala Siriniwasa Thero

Departments:
 Department of Pali 
 Department of Sinhala 
 Department of Sanskrit 
 Department of English 
 Department of Language Skills Development
 Department of English Language Teaching

Admissions
 Bachelor of Arts General Degree (Internal)
 Bachelor of Arts Special Degree

Postgraduate and External examination Unit
Courses
 PHD
 M.Phil
 M.A
 P.G.D
 B.A.

Diploma
 Diploma in Buddhism/Pali/Sanskrit 
 Diploma in Sanskrith
 Diploma in JAPANESE/KOREAN/FRENCH/CHINESE/HINDI/TAMIL/ENGLISH
 Diploma in Buddhist Counseling

Affiliated Institutions
 Singapore
 Malaysia
 South Korea
 Germany
 Austria
 Scotland
 England
 Buddhist & Pali Research Trust [R] (India ) 
 The Buddhist & Pali College (U.S.A)

Student life
Near 3000 students attend and others follow external degree programs conducted by the university.

Research & Publications

 https://web.archive.org/web/20151109155345/http://www.bpu.ac.lk/publications/research

See also
 Education in Sri Lanka
 Sri Lankan universities
 Buddhism in Sri Lanka
 Education in India
 Buddhism in India

References

 http://www.bpu.ac.lk/about/general/about-university
 https://web.archive.org/web/20131013185420/http://www.namaskara.lk/?sid=article&dt=2012%2F07&id=2012%2F07%2Fnpg56_0
 http://srilanka.lankatopten.com/profile/bouddhaloka_mawatha_551.html
 https://web.archive.org/web/20130618051949/http://www.nearby.lk/buddhistpalicampus
 http://lk.kompass.com/c/university-of-buddhist-pali-in-sri-lanka/lk004724/
 https://web.archive.org/web/20150617102244/http://www.buddhistpalitrust.com/

External links and reference
 Annual Report 2002

Buddhism in Sri Lanka
Buddhist universities and colleges
Educational institutions established in 1981
Seminaries and theological colleges in Sri Lanka
Statutory boards of Sri Lanka
Universities and colleges in Colombo District
Universities in Sri Lanka
1981 establishments in Sri Lanka